The 2003 West Coast Conference men's basketball tournament took place March 7–10, 2003. All rounds were held in San Diego, California at the Jenny Craig Pavilion. The semifinals were televised by ESPN2. The West Coast Conference Championship Game was televised by ESPN.

The San Diego Toreros earned their first WCC Tournament title and an automatic bid to the 2003 NCAA tournament. Jason Keep of San Diego was named Tournament MVP.

Bracket

See also 
West Coast Conference

References

Tournament
West Coast Conference men's basketball tournament
West Coast Athletic Conference men's basketball tournament
West Coast Athletic Conference men's basketball tournament